Tom Rainey (born 1957) is an American jazz drummer.

Career
After attending Berklee College of Music he moved to New York in 1979. He has played with Tim Berne, Nels Cline, Drew Gress, Mark Helias, Fred Hersch, Tony Malaby, Simon Nabatov, Tom Varner, and Kenny Werner.

Rainey worked with Berne in the 1990s and 2000s in the bands Big Satan, Hard Cell, Paraphrase, and Science Friction. After thirty years as a sideman, he released his first album, Pool School (Clean Feed, 2010) in a trio with guitarist Mary Halvorson and saxophonist Ingrid Laubrock.

Discography

As leader
 Pool School (Clean Feed, 2010)
 Camino Cielo Echo (Intakt, 2012)
 Obbligato (Intakt, 2014)
 Hotel Grief (Intakt, 2015)
 Float Upstream (Intakt, 2017)
 Combobulated (Intakt, 2019)
 Untucked In Hannover (Intakt, 2021)

As co-leader
With Simon Nabatov & Nils Wogram 
 Nawora (Leo, 2012)
With Ralph Alessi, Kris Davis & Ingrid Laubrock 
 LARK (Skirl, 2013)
With Ingrid Laubrock 
 And Other Desert Towns (Relative Pitch, 2014)
 Buoyancy (Relative Pitch, 2016)
 Utter (Relative Pitch, 2018)

As sideman 
With Ray Anderson
Big Band Record (Gramavision, 1994) with the George Gruntz Concert Jazz Band
With Tim Berne
 Visitation Rites (Screwgun), 1997)
 Big Satan (Winter & Winter, 1997)
 Please Advise (Screwgun, 1999)
 The Shell Game (Thirsty Ear, 2001)
 Science Friction (Screwgun, 2002)
 The Sublime And (Thirsty Ear, 2003)
 Souls Saved Hear (Thirsty Ear, 2004)
 Electric and Acoustic Hard Cell Live (Screwgun, 2004)
 Feign (Screwgun, 2005)
 Pre-Emptive Denial (Screwgun, 2005)
 Livein Cognito (Screwgun, 2006)
With Nels Cline
Currents, Constellations (Blue Note, 2018)
With Kris Davis
 Good Citizen (Fresh Sound New Talent, 2010)
 Capricorn Climber (Clean Feed, 2013)
 Waiting for You to Grow (Clean Feed, 2014)
With Mark Feldman
 What Exit (ECM, 2006)
With Ronan Guilfoyle
 Hands (Portmanteau, 2015)
With Ingrid Laubrock
 Sleepthief (Intakt, 2008)
 Anti-House (Intakt, 2010)
 The Madness of Crowds (Intakt, 2011)
 Strong Place (Intakt, 2013)
 Zurich Concert (Intakt, 2014)
 Roulette of the Cradle (Intakt, 2015)
 Ubatuba (Firehouse 12, 2015)
With Liam Noble
 Romance Among the Fishes (Basho, 2004)
With Samo Salamon
 Two Hours (Fresh Sound New Talent, 2006)
 Almost Almond (Sanje, 2011)
 Duality (Samo Records, 2012)
With David Torn
 Prezens (ECM, 2005)
With Tom Varner
 The Mystery of Compassion (Soul Note, 1992)
 Martian Heartache (Soul Note, 1996)
With Roseanna Vitro
 Reaching for the Moon (Chase Music Group, 1991)
 Softly (Concord Jazz, 1993)
With Jane Ira Bloom
 Modern Drama (Columbia, 1987)
 Slalom (Columbia, 1988)

References

External links
 Allaboutjazz Tom Rainey interview

Avant-garde jazz musicians
1957 births
Living people
Musicians from Santa Barbara, California
American jazz drummers
20th-century American drummers
American male drummers
Jazz musicians from California
20th-century American male musicians
American male jazz musicians
Big Satan members
Intakt Records artists
Basho Records artists
Clean Feed Records artists